Sparhawk may refer to:

An older or dialect name for the sparrowhawk
Alan Sparhawk, American guitarist and vocalist
Elizabeth Sparhawk-Jones, American painter
John C. "Bud" Sparhawk, American author
Sparhawk Mill in Yarmouth, Maine